Olleros is a station on Line D of the Buenos Aires Underground. The station was opened on 31 May 1997 as part of the extension of the line from Ministro Carranza to José Hernández.

References

External links

Buenos Aires Underground stations
1997 establishments in Argentina